Makis Giannikoglou (born 25 March 1993) is a Greek professional footballer who plays as goalkeeper for Super League 2 club Panserraikos.

He started his football in the youth ranks of Skoda Xanthi. Professionally he has played for Omonia, Kavala, Fokikos, Iraklis, PAS Giannina, AEK and lithuanian FK Sūduva. He has been capped for Greece U17.

Club career

Giannikoglou was playing for the second team of Skoda Xanthi. Later on, in 2011 he signed a contract with the Cypriot team Omonia. In July 2014 he signed for Fokikos. On 30 December 2014 he signed for Iraklis for two and a half years.

PAS Giannina 
On 10 August 2017 he signed for PAS Giannina for a year.

AEK Athens 
On 26 June 2018, Giannikoglou signed with AEK Athens until the summer of 2021. The 25-year old goalkeeper Giannikoglou, who only made four Super League appearances with PAS Giannina in the 2017–18 campaign, has signed a three-year deal with AEK after his PAS Giannina's contract reached its conclusion. AEK confirmed the transfer with this following statement on their official website: “AEK FC announces the arrival of goalkeeper Makis Giannikoglou, who has signed a cooperation agreement until the summer of 2021.” In an interview with the official AEK's site, Giannikoglou shared his emotions from the move: “I am very happy to be an AEK player, it’s a dream come true,”  beamed Giannikoglou. “I am delighted to work with Vasilis Barkas and Panagiotis Tsintotas, the goalkeepers which made AEK champions alongside Giannis Anestis. It’s a great incentive for any Greek footballer to wear the AEK shirt, my goal is to work hard and be ready for when I receive a chance.”

PAS Giannina 
On 13 June 2019, Giannikoglou returned to PAS Giannina. With PAS Giannina, he won the Football League: 2019–20 and got promoted to the Super League Greece.

International career
Giannikoglou debuted for Greece U17 in 2009 in a friendly match against Belarus national under-17 football team. He appeared in two more matches in 2010 UEFA European Under-17 Championship in Liechtenstein.

Career statistics

Club
As of 28 April 2022

Honours
Sūduva
Lithuanian Supercup: 2022
Lithuanian Championship: Runner-Up 2021

Omonia
Cypriot Cup: 2012
Cyprus FA Shield: 2012

PAS Giannina
Super League Greece 2: 2019–20

References

External links
 Video About The Player

1993 births
Living people
Greek footballers
Greece youth international footballers
Association football goalkeepers
Footballers from Kavala
Cypriot First Division players
Super League Greece players
Football League (Greece) players
A Lyga players
Super League Greece 2 players
Xanthi F.C. players
AC Omonia players
Kavala F.C. players
Fokikos A.C. players
Iraklis Thessaloniki F.C. players
PAS Giannina F.C. players
AEK Athens F.C. players
FK Sūduva Marijampolė players
Panserraikos F.C. players
Greek expatriate footballers
Greek expatriate sportspeople in Cyprus
Expatriate footballers in Cyprus
Greek expatriate sportspeople in Lithuania
Expatriate footballers in Lithuania